"C'est la Vie" is a song by American singer-songwriter Robbie Nevil, from his self-titled debut album in 1986. The song was first recorded by gospel singer Beau Williams for his album Bodacious! (1984).

Written by Nevil, with Duncan Pain and Mark Holding, Nevil recorded the song for his eponymous debut album, and it was released as the first single.  Nevil's single spent two weeks at number two on the US Billboard Hot 100 singles chart in January 1987 and remained in the top 40 for 16 weeks, becoming his highest-charting US hit. (It was kept from number one by two songs, "Shake You Down" by Gregory Abbott and "At This Moment" by Billy Vera and the Beaters.) Additionally, the song went to number one on the Hot Dance Club Play American dance chart for one week in February 1987 with an Arthur Baker remix. . Internationally, the song reached number three on the UK singles charts and number one in Canada and Switzerland. The song featured in the Black Mirror episode, "San Junipero" and the Snowfall episode, The Sit Down.

Track listing

A-side
"C'est la Vie" (Extended Version) – 7:04
"C'est la Vie" (Single Version) – 3:28

B-side
"C'est la Vie" (Dub Version) – 7:07
"Time Waits for No One" – 5:22

Chart performance

Weekly charts

Year-end charts

Certifications

See also
List of number-one dance hits (United States)

References

External links
 

1986 songs
1987 songs
1986 debut singles
Robbie Nevil songs
Songs written by Robbie Nevil
Song recordings produced by Alex Sadkin
Song recordings produced by Phil Thornalley
RPM Top Singles number-one singles
Number-one singles in Switzerland
Manhattan Records singles